Dinerral Jevone "Dick" Shavers (March 19, 1981 — December 28, 2006) was an American jazz drummer and educator from New Orleans, Louisiana, who was best known as a member of the Hot 8 Brass Band.

Career

Shavers was a founding member of the Hot 8 Brass Band.  He also taught music at L.E. Rabouin Career Magnet High School and created music programs for disadvantaged local youths. He appeared in the 2006 Spike Lee documentary film When the Levees Broke discussing the devastation of his family home in the Lower 9th Ward following Hurricane Katrina.

Death
Shavers was fatally shot at around 5:30 p.m. on December 28, 2006. He had been driving his family in a black Chevrolet Malibu in the 2200 block of Dumaine Street. Although critically wounded, he continued driving four blocks up Dumaine before stopping. By 6 p.m., Shavers lay motionless on his back in the middle of the street just outside the open driver's side door. Although he was taken to a hospital he died within an hour.

It was later revealed in the Times-Picayune that Shavers was not the intended target. New Orleans Police said the teenager who shot him actually meant to kill Shavers' 15-year-old stepson in a dispute stemming from a neighborhood feud. Shavers' murder, along with a spate of other violent crimes in New Orleans within the same week (including the murder of local filmmaker Helen Hill), sparked a massive protest march on New Orleans City Hall on January 11, 2007.

In popular culture
Shavers' murder by a teenager was discussed in Spike Lee's sequel documentary film If God Is Willing and Da Creek Don't Rise (2010), and it was included in the HBO series Treme, in season 2, episodes 4 and 5.

References

External links
 Louisiana Weekly article on Shaver's death
 Times-Picayune article on the arrest of his murderer
 Times-Picayune article on Shaver's family seven months after his murder
 Hot 8 Documentary
 Drummer Boy: A Glimpse Into The Life of Dinerral Shavers

1981 births
2006 deaths
2006 murders in the United States
20th-century American drummers
20th-century American male musicians
American jazz drummers
American male drummers
American male jazz musicians
Deaths by firearm in Louisiana
Jazz musicians from New Orleans
Murdered African-American people
People murdered in Louisiana
20th-century African-American musicians